Daniel G. Knauss was the Acting United States Attorney for the District of Arizona. Knauss served in that position in 1993 until Janet Napolitano was appointed by President Bill Clinton as United States Attorney for the District of Arizona.  Knauss also served in the same position in 2007, receiving an appointment from George W. Bush.  As of 2007, Knauss has worked for 34 years as an assistant district attorney.

References

United States Attorneys for the District of Arizona
Year of birth missing (living people)
Living people